In grammar, the inessive case (abbreviated ; from  "to be in or at") is a locative grammatical case.

In Finnish the inessive case is typically formed by adding . Estonian adds  to the genitive stem. In Moksha  is added (in Erzya ).

In the Finnish language, the inessive case is considered the first (in Estonian the second) of the six locative cases, which correspond to locational  prepositions in English.  The remaining five cases are:

 Elative case ("out of")
 Illative case ("into")
 Allative case ("onto")
 Adessive case ("on")
 Ablative case ("from")

Finnish

It is usually added to nouns and associated adjectives.

It is used in the following ways:

 Expressing the static state of being in something.
 = we live in Finland

 (with time expressions) stating how long something took to be accomplished or done
possible English translations include in, within
 = within 2 years, during 2 years

 when two things are closely connected
English translations can include on in phrases of this type
 = N.N. on the phone 
 = the ring is on my finger

as an existensial clause with the verb  (to be), to express possession of objects
 = the newspaper has 68 pages

with the verb , 
 = I visit the bar

There are both singular and plural forms
 = I visit the bars

Dialectal variants 
In a large part of the southwestern, south Ostrobothnian, southeastern as well as in some Tavastian dialects, the suffix is simply -s (e.g. maas, talos), similarly to Estonian. This is an example of apocope. When coupled with a possessive suffix,  the result can be like in standard Finnish "maassani, talossani" or a shorter "maasani, talosani" depending on the dialect: the former is more common in Tavastian and southeastern dialects while the latter is more common in southwestern dialects.

Most central and northern Ostrobothnian dialects as well as some southwestern and Peräpohjola dialects use a shorter suffix -sa/-sä, e.g. maasa, talosa.

Further reading

References

Grammatical cases